The following is a list of members of the Western Australian Legislative Assembly between the 1897 elections and the 1901 elections, together known as the Third Parliament.

Notes
 On 12 May 1897, Henry Lefroy, the member for Moore, was appointed Minister for Education by Premier John Forrest, and on 27 October 1897, Richard Pennefather, the member for Greenough, was appointed Attorney-General. Both were therefore required to resign and contest ministerial by-elections, at which both were returned unopposed.
 On 13 June 1899, George Hubble, the member for Gascoyne, resigned. He was returned unopposed in the resulting by-election on 26 June 1899.
 On 15 June 1899, Frederick Monger, the member for York, resigned. He was returned unopposed in the resulting by-election on 26 June 1899.
 On 27 June 1899, George Simpson, the Opposition member for Geraldton, resigned. At the resulting by-election held on 12 July 1899, he was defeated by Independent candidate Richard Robson. On 13 June 1900, Robson resigned, and at the by-election held to replace him on 24 July 1900, Opposition candidate Robert Hutchinson was successful. He went on to win the seat unopposed at the 1901 election nine months later.
 Henry Kenny, the Opposition member for North Murchison, died on 25 August 1899. Ministerial candidate Frederick Moorhead won the resulting by-election on 18 September 1899.
 Septimus Burt, the member for Ashburton, resigned in April 1900. At the resulting by-election, David Forrest, the younger brother of Premier John Forrest and Alexander Forrest, was returned unopposed on 24 April 1900. The year from the by-election until the April 1901 general election marked the only time in the history of Western Australia when three members of the same family had held seats in the Parliament concurrently. By July 1901, all were gone—John was elected to the new Federal Parliament representing the seat of Swan, Alexander died, and David was defeated in his bid for Electoral district of Gascoyne.
 E. T. Hooley, the member for De Grey, resigned on 1 May 1900. Leonard Darlot was returned unopposed in the resulting by-election on 28 May 1900.
 On 10 July 1900, George Leake, the Opposition member for Albany, resigned. At the by-election held to replace him on 24 July 1900, Opposition candidate John Hassell was successful.
 On 10 September 1900, Barrington Wood, the member for West Perth, was appointed Commissioner of Railways and Minister for Works by Premier John Forrest. He were therefore required to resign and contest a ministerial by-election, at which he was returned unopposed on 22 September 1900.
 The seat of North Perth was declared vacant on 16 October 1900 as the Labour member, Charles Oldham, had been absent without leave of the House for two months. No by-election was held due to the imminent 1901 election.
 Frederick Vosper, the Opposition member for North-East Coolgardie, died on 6 January 1901, but no by-election was held due to the imminent 1901 election.

Sources
 
 

Members of Western Australian parliaments by term